The 1907 Bury St Edmunds by-election was held on 24 August 1907.  The by-election was held due to the succession to the peerage of the incumbent Conservative MP, Frederick Hervey who become the Fourth Marquess of Bristol.  It was won by the Conservative candidate Walter Guinness.

Campaign

The by-election was a strong campaigning ground for the suffragette movement and the Women's Social and Political Union made it a target for propaganda sending high level members, including Gladice Keevil, Nellie Martel, Emmeline Pankhurst, Aeta Lamb, Rachel Barrett and Elsa Gye.

Result

References

Bury St Edmunds by-election
Bury St Edmunds by-election
Bury St Edmunds by-election
Bury St Edmunds
Borough of St Edmundsbury
Bury